Qabbani is a surname. Notable people with the surname include:

Abu Khalil Qabbani (1835–1902), Syrian playwright and composer of Turkish origin
Ghalia Qabbani, Syrian writer and journalist
Ismail al-Qabbani (1898–1963), Egyptian reforming educationalist
Mohammed Rashid Qabbani (born 1942), former Grand Mufti of Lebanon and the most prominent Sunni Muslim cleric in the country
Mundhir Qabbānī (born 1970), also known as Monzer al-Qabbani, Saudi writer, novelist and surgeon
Nizar Qabbani (1923–1998), Syrian diplomat, poet and publisher
Sabah Qabbani (1928–2015),  Ambassadors of Syria to the United States

See also 
Wadi Qabbani, was a Palestinian Arab village in the Tulkarm Subdistrict